07 is the sixth studio album by Croatian recording artist Nina Badrić, released in 2007 by Aquarius Records.

Track listing

References

Nina Badrić albums
2007 albums